KDTL-LD (channel 17) is a low-power television station in St. Louis, Missouri, United States, airing programming from the digital multicast network Circle. It is owned and operated by Gray Television alongside CBS affiliate KMOV (channel 4). The two stations share studios at the Gateway Tower on Memorial Drive in Downtown St. Louis, near the Gateway Arch; KDTL-LD's transmitter is located in Lemay, Missouri.

History
It began as K64DT in 1990. It increased its power, changing its callsign to KDTL-LP in 2004, referring to "Daystar Television St. Louis". Its former callsign, K64DT, was randomly assigned and has no meaning unlike the similar callsign it has now. On January 5, 2012, the station changed its call sign to the current KDTL-LD, reflecting its transition to digital broadcasting.

On May 9, 2022, it was announced that Daystar parent company Word of God Fellowship would sell KDTL-LD to Atlanta-based Gray Television for $1 million; the sale was completed on July 1.

References

Television stations in St. Louis
Circle (TV network) affiliates
Television channels and stations established in 1992
1992 establishments in Missouri
Low-power television stations in the United States
Gray Television